The following is a list of artists described as general purveyors of the acid rock genre. Acid rock is a loosely defined type of rock music that evolved out of the mid-1960s garage punk movement and helped launch the psychedelic subculture. The style is generally defined by heavy, distorted guitars, lyrics with drug references, and long improvised jams. Its distinctions from other genres can be tenuous, as much of the style overlaps with 1960s punk, proto-metal, and early heavy, blues-based hard rock.

Artists

See also

Acid rock
List of psychedelic rock artists
List of psychedelic folk artists
List of psychedelic pop artists
List of neo-psychedelia artists

References

Bibliography

Acid rock